

The AVIS C.4 was a 1940s Italian liaison aircraft designed by Ugo Abate and built by Avio Industrie Stabiensi (AVIS)  for an Italian Air Force requirement for a liaison aircraft with a similar role to the Fieseler Fi 156.

First flown in June 1940 the low-wing monoplane was in competition with the IMAM Ro.63 and Caproni GDL, but the results of test flights were not satisfactory and only one C.4 was built of the six originally ordered.

Specifications

See also

References

1940s Italian military utility aircraft
STOL aircraft
Single-engined tractor aircraft
Low-wing aircraft
Aircraft first flown in 1940